Jean Cerrottini (born 19 October 1938) is a Swiss fencer. He competed in the individual foil event at the 1960 Summer Olympics.

References

External links
 

1938 births
Living people
Swiss male foil fencers
Olympic fencers of Switzerland
Fencers at the 1960 Summer Olympics
Sportspeople from Lausanne